"Schönes Mädchen aus Arcadia" is a song by Greek singer Demis Roussos. It was released as a single in 1973 and was also part of Demis Roussos' 1974 German-language album Auf Wiedersehn.

There was also an English version of the song, called  "Lovely Lady of Arcadia". The English version was included on Roussos's 1974 English-language album My Only Fascination.

Background and writing 
The song "Schönes Mädchen aus Arcadia" (the German version) was written by Klaus Munro (from Hamburg) and composed by Leo Leandros. The recording was produced by Leo Leandros.

The credits for the English version list an additional songwriter, Jack Lloyd.

Commercial performance 
"Schönes Mädchen aus Arcadia" reached no. 1 in Netherlands and Belgium (Flanders).

Track listings

"Schönes Mädchen aus Arcadia" 
7" single Philips 6009 394 (1973, Austria, Germany, Switzerland, Netherlands, etc.)
 A. "Schönes Mädchen aus Arcadia" (3:25)
 B. "So wie du bist" (3:35)

"Lovely Lady of Arcadia" 
7" single Philips 6009 518 (1973, France, etc.)
 A. "Lovely Lady of Arcadia" (3:19)
 B. "Shadows" (3:17)

7" single RTB S 53758 (1974, Yugoslavia)
 A. "Lovely Lady Of Arcadia" (3:25)
 B. "Let It Be Me" (3:31)

Charts

"Schönes Mädchen aus Arcadia"

Cover versions 
In 1975 the song was recorded by Andy Williams.

See also 
 List of Dutch Top 40 number-one singles of 1973

References 

1973 songs
1973 singles
Demis Roussos songs
Philips Records singles
Dutch Top 40 number-one singles
Ultratop 50 Singles (Flanders) number-one singles
Songs written by Leo Leandros
Song recordings produced by Leo Leandros